Dien Bien Phu Airport  is located at Điện Biên Phủ in Vietnam.

History
Điện Biên Phủ Airport was established in 1954 as Mường Thanh Airfield. The main purpose of it is to serve the French HQ in Điện Biên Phủ at the time of the First Indochina War.

4 years after the French left Điện Biên Phủ, in 1958, commercial flights to the airport started, operated by the Air Force, but only for a while due to the low demand at the time. In 1984, along with the 30th Anniversary of the Battle of Dien Bien Phu, flights from Hanoi to Điện Biên Phủ resumed, operated by the Antonov An-24. 10 months later, in January 30, 1995, this route is once again suspended because of the runway needed to be repaired. After the repair, flight resumed, this time being operated by the ATR 72. In 2004, the airport's apron is extended to 12000 square meters, with 4 parking stands for ATR 72 aircraft.

Facilities
Today, Điện Biên Phủ Airport is the largest and only commercial airport serving the city of Điện Biên Phủ in particular and the entire Northwest region of Vietnam, after the closure of Nà Sản Airport in 2004. It is located in the middle of a basin at an altitude of 1.611 meters above sea level. The sole runway (16/34) has a concrete surface and a length 1830 meters (6003 ft) long and width of 30 m (98.4 ft), large enough to accommodate aircraft such as the ATR 72 or the Fokker F70 and potentially the Embraer E190 and E195 with some payload restrictions as demonstrated by Bamboo Airways' use of the jets at Con Dao Airport, which has a similar-length runway.

The apron and taxiway is 7500 square meters wide, with 4 parking stands for aircraft. The terminal is 2500 square meters wide and is capable of serving 4 flights per day.

Challenges
Due to its geographical position, the airport's runway cannot be extended to serve larger aircraft such as the Airbus A320 family, Boeing 737 and similar. The installation of night lights and modern guidance systems is also not possible due to the atmospheric and weather conditions at the airport, render it only capable of serving daytime flights. Also, the cancel rate of flights to Dien Bien Phu is also higher than other routes, due to the unpredictable and inclement nature of the weather at the airport.

And due to its short runway and the aircraft type serving it, the airport can only serve short-haul routes, such as Hanoi- Dien Bien Phu or Hai Phong-Dien Bien Phu.

Expansion
Recently, Dien Bien province People's Committee has approved the temporary closure of the airport following an expansion proposal by the Civil Aviation Authority of Vietnam. The closure will start from April 1st and lasts 6 months. The investor of the project, Airports Corporation of Vietnam (ACV) has committed to complete the project before October, which includes building a new security fence until June and the lengthening and widening of the runway and upgrading the terminal.

The runway will be extended to 2400 m (7874 ft) and widened to 45 m, enabling the airport to accommodate A320/A321 or equivalent aircraft. The terminal will be upgraded to receive up to 500 thousand passengers per year.

The project cost is estimated to be around VND 1.467 trillion (US$ 62 million), all paid for by ACV.

Airlines and destinations

Gallery

See also 

 List of airports in Vietnam

References

External links

Airports in Vietnam
Dien Bien Phu
Buildings and structures in Điện Biên province